Many Farms High School (MFHS) is located in the heart of the Navajo reservation in Many Farms, Arizona, and  northeast of Canyon De Chelly National Monument. It has 445 (yearly average) students and 35 faculty members along with a large support staff. It is a boarding school operated by the US Department of the Interior Bureau of Indian Education, with separate dormitories for male and female students. It opened its doors in 1969.

Campus
It is co-located with the Many Farms Community School (formerly Chinle Boarding School), a K–8 boarding school. Before Diné College moved to Tsaile, it was situated on the Many Farms BIE school complex.

In 1991 there were problems with maintenance and upkeep in the dormitory for male students.

Athletics and activities
The sports team is the "Lobos" ("wolves" in Spanish). It participates in American football, cross-country, volleyball, basketball, wrestling, baseball, softball and track and field, and is part of the Arizona Interscholastic Association. The school also has several clubs within the academic setting.

References

External links 
 

Public high schools in Arizona
Educational institutions established in 1969
Schools in Apache County, Arizona
Boarding schools in Arizona
Native American boarding schools
Public boarding schools in the United States
Native American schools in Arizona
Education on the Navajo Nation
Sports in Arizona